The  Bloeizone Fryslân Tour, also known as the EasyToys Bloeizone Fryslân Tour for sponsorship reasons is an elite women's annual multiple stage road bicycle race event held in the province Groningen in the Netherlands since 2011. The stage race is rated by the UCI as category 2.1, having been upgraded from 2.2 in 2018. The race was previously known as the Energiewacht Tour from 2011 to 2016 and then the Healthy Ageing Tour from 2017 to 2021.

Winners

Jerseys

References

External links 
 
 

 
2011 establishments in the Netherlands
Cycle races in the Netherlands
Recurring sporting events established in 2011
Women's road bicycle races
Cycling in Groningen (province)